C31 or C-31 may refer to:

Vehicles 
 Fokker C-31A Troopship, a Dutch military transport
 , a C-class submarine of the Royal Navy
 Nissan Laurel C31, a Japanese sedan
 Sauber C31, a Swiss Formula One car

Other uses 
 Blackstripe corydoras, a tropical freshwater fish
 C-31 highway (Spain), in Catalonia
 C31 road (Namibia)
 Bill C-31, various legislation of the Parliament of Canada
 Caldwell 31, an emission/reflection nebula
 Channel 31 (disambiguation)
 King's Gambit, Falkbeer Countergambit, a chess opening
 C31, a London Cycleway